Faridah Begum bte Abdullah v. Sultan Haji Ahmad Shah (1996) 1 MLJ 617 was the first and is as of 2007 the only case to have been heard by the Special Court of Malaysia which hears cases brought against the Malay rulers (the sultans who serve as constitutional monarchs of seven of the Malay states).

The plaintiff was a Singaporean businesswoman and the defendant was the Sultan of Pahang. Faridah alleged that the Sultan had committed libel against her, and sued for damages. The Attorney General consented to the case, permitting the Special Court to hear it. However, whether the alleged libel had in fact occurred was never decided, as the Special Court ruled 4-1 that non-Malaysians could not bring a suit against the Malay rulers.

Background

In 1993, the Constitution of Malaysia was amended, with a new Part XV being added. This Part XV provided for the constitution of a Special Court to try the Malay rulers for any crime, as well as any civil cases brought against them; previously, the rulers had been above the law. The Special Court would comprise the Chief Justice, the Chief Judge of Malaya, the Chief Judge of Sabah and Sarawak, and two judges, present or past, from either the Federal Court or a High Court, nominated by the Conference of Rulers.

Faridah Begum was the first case heard by the Special Court, and remains the only case it has ever heard as of 2007.

Decision

Both the plaintiff and the defendant agreed that the first question that had to be settled was whether the plaintiff had legal standing to sue a Malay ruler. The Special Court held in a 4-1 decision that it was not possible for Article 182 of the Constitution to confer the right to bring a suit against a Malay ruler upon non-Malaysians, because this would be ultra vires (in contravention of) Article 155. Eussoff Chin wrote:

The dissenting judge took a different view, arguing that as the intent of the amendments had been to permit legal action to be brought against the rulers, removing their immunity, it was now permissible for anyone, including non-citizens, to bring a case against one of the rulers. Then Malaysian Prime Minister Mahathir bin Mohamad later said that the government would consider amending the Constitution to explicitly allow foreign nationals to sue a Sultan "if the present legal provision is not serving justice"; however, no action was ever taken.

Notes and references

Malaysian case law
1996 in case law
1996 in Malaysia